Alexander Donaldson McLaughlan (17 July 1936 – 13 April 1990) was a Scottish football goalkeeper, who played for Kilmarnock and Sunderland. McLaughlan represented the Scottish League once, in 1962. He played in the 1962/63 Scottish League Cup Final for Killie, losing 1–0 to Hearts.

References

External links 

1936 births
1990 deaths
People from Kilwinning
Association football goalkeepers
Scottish footballers
Kilmarnock F.C. players
Sunderland A.F.C. players
Scottish Football League players
English Football League players
Scottish Football League representative players
Footballers from North Ayrshire
Date of death missing